Peđa Krstin was the defending champion but lost in the first round to Caio Zampieri.

Andrej Martin won the title after defeating Adrián Menéndez-Maceiras 7–5, 6–4 in the final.

Seeds

Draw

Finals

Top half

Bottom half

References
Main Draw
Qualifying Draw

San Luis Open Challenger Tour - Singles
2017 Singles